Valentyn Tikhonovich Borysov (born 20 July 1901 in Bohodukhiv; died 1988) was a Ukrainian composer. In 1927 Barysov graduated from the Kharkiv National Kotlyarevsky University of Arts.

References

Ukrainian classical composers
1901 births
1988 deaths
20th-century composers